The canton of Guebwiller is an administrative division of the Haut-Rhin department, northeastern France. Its borders were modified at the French canton reorganisation which came into effect in March 2015. Its seat is in Guebwiller.

It consists of the following communes:

Bergholtz
Bergholtzzell
Buhl
Guebwiller
Hartmannswiller
Issenheim
Jungholtz
Lautenbach
Lautenbachzell
Linthal
Merxheim
Murbach
Orschwihr
Raedersheim
Rimbach-près-Guebwiller
Rimbachzell
Soultz-Haut-Rhin
Wuenheim

References

Cantons of Haut-Rhin